British musicians may refer to:

 List of music artists and bands from England
 List of Scottish musicians
 List of Welsh musicians

See also 
 :Category:Lists of British musicians